Anjali Jay  (born 9 August 1970) is a British actress, writer and dancer.  She  trained as a dancer (Bharatanatyam and Contemporary) and has performed since the age of 7. Jay has had an extensive career in theatre, including working with the Royal Shakespeare company and in movies such as  Night at the Museum: Secret of the Tomb, Blind Dating, and The Age of Adaline. She played Djaq in the  BBC television series Robin Hood , and has had long-running roles in Supergirl (CW) and Salvation (CBS).

Personal life 
Jay was born in India and grew up in Bangalore. She attended Sophia High School until 1986. She graduated with a BA degree from Mount Carmel College in 1991. Jay is trained in Bharatanatyam and contemporary dance. She went to Britain on a Charles Wallace Scholarship for her MA degree in Dance Theatre at the Laban Centre. After graduating, she performed a season with the Shobana Jaysingh Dance Company.

Career
Jay appeared opposite Chris Pine in Blind Dating. Jay was praised by Jack G. Shaheen for her "heroic" portrayal of an Arab Muslim woman, Djaq, in the Robin Hood TV series.

Acting credits

Film

Television

Radio
 The Making of a Marchioness (2007) as Hester
 Goan Flame (2000)

Theatre
 Romeo and Juliet (2006; UK tour) as Juliet
 The Jungle Book (2004–05; UK tour) as Bagheera/ Dulia
 Anne of Green Gables (2004; Lilian Bayliss Theatre) as Katie Maurice
 Midnight's Children (2003; Royal Shakespeare Company) as Jamila.
 Tales of the Arabian Nights (2000; UK tour)
 Border Crossings production of Mappa Mundi (2000; Courtyard Theatre, Hereford)
 The Maids
 Dance Like A Man as Latah
 Vesuvius (1997; The Nehru Centre of the High Commission of India, London)

References

External links
 
 Profile

Living people
1975 births
Actresses from Bangalore
Actresses from London
Indian emigrants to the United Kingdom
British actresses of Indian descent
British female dancers
British film actresses
British radio actresses
British stage actresses
British television actresses
British expatriates in Canada
Royal Shakespeare Company members
British Shakespearean actresses
Mount Carmel College, Bangalore alumni
Alumni of Trinity College of Music
21st-century British actresses